Riverdale is one of two commuter rail stations on the Metra Electric main branch in Riverdale, Illinois, a village just southwest of the adjacent Riverdale neighborhood of Chicago, Illinois.

It is built on a bridge embankment south of 137th Street, which also carries Amtrak's City of New Orleans, Illini, and Saluki trains. A wrought-iron fence exists between the sidewalk and the street below the station, and bridges are available beneath the tracks for 137th and 138th Streets. Parking is primarily available along Illinois Street and the railroad tracks between 137th and 139th Streets, but street-side parking can also be found on the opposite side of Illinois Street between 137th Street and 137th Place, and along 137th Street west of the railroad bridge.

Bus connections
Pace
  348 Harvey/Riverdale/Blue Island

References

External links 

Metra Railfan Photos (Riverdale Station)
138th Street entrance from Google Maps Street View

Metra stations in Illinois
Former Illinois Central Railroad stations
Railway stations in Cook County, Illinois
Riverdale, Illinois